Michael Robert Lindsay (2 November 1938 – 11 December 2019) was a British track and field athlete who competed in the discus throw and shot put disciplines. He represented Great Britain at the 1960 Summer Olympics and in the 1964 Summer Olympics.

He was a three-time winner of the discus (1957, 1959, 1960) at the AAA Championships and also won the shot put title at the event in 1963. He placed in the top three in the shot put six times at the AAAs in the 1960s.

Lindsay also competed internationally for Scotland as a three-time participant at the British Empire and Commonwealth Games from 1958 to 1970. His best performance was a silver medal double at the 1962 British Empire and Commonwealth Games.

He was also a double throws runner-up for Great Britain at the 1963 Summer Universiade.

References

External links
 

1938 births
2019 deaths
British male shot putters
British male discus throwers
Scottish male discus throwers
Sportspeople from Glasgow
Scottish male shot putters
Olympic athletes of Great Britain
Athletes (track and field) at the 1960 Summer Olympics
Athletes (track and field) at the 1964 Summer Olympics
Commonwealth Games medallists in athletics
Athletes (track and field) at the 1958 British Empire and Commonwealth Games
Athletes (track and field) at the 1962 British Empire and Commonwealth Games
Athletes (track and field) at the 1966 British Empire and Commonwealth Games
Athletes (track and field) at the 1970 British Commonwealth Games
Commonwealth Games silver medallists for Scotland
Universiade medalists in athletics (track and field)
Universiade silver medalists for Great Britain
Medalists at the 1963 Summer Universiade
Medallists at the 1962 British Empire and Commonwealth Games